Beggo (died 28 October 816) was the son of Gerard I of Paris. He was appointed Count of Toulouse, Duke of Septimania, Duke of Aquitaine, and Margrave of the Hispanic March in 806 and followed his father as Count of Paris in 815.

In 806, William of Gellone abdicated and Charlemagne appointed Beggo to take his place in Toulouse and the  March of Gothia. He did not succeed his father in Paris, but was later placed in the comital office there, but did not live long after that.

He married Alpais, granddaughter of Charlemagne. Their children were:
Leuthard II, who later ruled Paris
Eberhard.

He may also have been the father of the following children, by one or more other women.

Landrade
Susanna, whose son was Adalhard, eighth Count of Paris
Engeltrude, whose son was Eberhard of Friuli.

References

816 deaths
Counts of Toulouse
Dukes of Septimania
Dukes of Aquitaine
Counts of Paris
Margrave of the Hispanic March
Year of birth unknown
House of Girard
Nobility of the Carolingian Empire